Paul Christian Gordon (October 19, 1963 – February 18, 2016) was an American musician, composer, and producer. A keyboardist and guitarist, he was a member of New Radicals and the keyboardist and rhythm guitarist for the B-52's from 2007 until his death in 2016.

Early life
Paul Christian Gordon was born on October 19, 1963, in Everett, Massachusetts, to Rev. Calvin Paul Gordon and Barbara (Landry) Gordon. In 1966, the family relocated to Newport, Rhode Island, where Rev. Gordon pastored the Evangelical Friends Church. Paul Gordon graduated from Rogers High School in 1981.

Career
Gordon worked with Joseph Williams, TotoNatasha Bedingfield, Goo Goo Dolls, The B-52's, Danielle Brisebois, New Radicals, Prince, Jennifer Nettles, Lisa Marie Presley, Charles & Eddie,  The Devlins, Eran DD, Jeffrey Gaines, John Gregory, Nona Hendryx, Carly Hennessy, The Juliet Dagger, Jill Jones, Chaka Khan,  Lila McCann, Mandy Moore, Jenni Muldaur,   Trine Rein, Wild Orchid and David Yazbek.

Gordon also composed music for both television and film soundtracks.  His clients included The Fox Network, ABC Family and Spike TV.  Some of the compositions  he wrote or co-wrote include the themes for Digimon, Transformers: Robots in Disguise, Power Rangers Wild Force, the Great Pretenders and Stripperella.

Personal life
Gordon was married to Jennifer (Lysak) Gordon. They had two sons.

Death
On February 18, 2016, Gordon died in Nashville, Tennessee, at age 52, from complications of heart disease.

References

External links
 Kurzweil Artist Lounge: Paul Gordon
 Smartsound profile
 

1963 births
2016 deaths
American male composers
20th-century American composers
American session musicians
20th-century American keyboardists
Musicians from Nashville, Tennessee
American male songwriters
Musicians from Newport, Rhode Island
Songwriters from Tennessee
Songwriters from Rhode Island
Guitarists from Rhode Island
20th-century American guitarists
American male guitarists
20th-century American male musicians